The Leventritt Silver Ribbon Pairs national bridge championship is held at the spring American Contract Bridge League (ACBL) North American Bridge Championship (NABC).

The Leventritt Silver Ribbon Pairs is a four session matchpoint (MP) pairs event with two qualifying and two final sessions. The event typically starts on the first Sunday of the NABC.

History

The Silver Ribbon Pairs is an event open only to players who are at least 55 years old and who have pre-qualified by placing first or second in a regional or national-rated senior event.

The Silver Ribbon Pairs consists of two qualifying and two final sessions. The winners will have their names inscribed on the Leventritt Trophy and will receive a certificate of recognition.

The trophy honors Peter Leventritt of New York, ACBL president in 1954 and assistant treasurer 1945–46. He served as president of the Greater New York Bridge Association and the Card School of New York, which he co-founded. Leventritt (1915–1997) pioneered the use of the Schenken System in partnership with its inventor, Howard Schenken. He represented North America in the Bermuda Bowl and placed second in 1957, 1961, 1963 and 1965.

Winners

References

Other sources

List of previous winners, Page 4.

2009 winners, Page 1.

2010 winners, Page 1.

ACBL Database - Leventritt Silver Ribbon Pairs Winners

External links
ACBL official website

North American Bridge Championships